147th meridian may refer to:

147th  meridian east, a line of longitude east of the Greenwich Meridian
147th meridian west, a line of longitude west of the Greenwich Meridian